Herman Charles Reich (November 23, 1917 – October 22, 2009) was an American first baseman/right fielder in Major League Baseball who played for three teams during the  season. A native of Bell, California, he attended Loyola Marymount University.

Biography
Reich has the rare distinction of being part of three transactions in his only major league season. He appeared in three games with the Cleveland Indians (1) and Washington Senators (2) before joining the Chicago Cubs, all during 8 days. He became the regular first baseman for the Cubs and also was among the team's nine right fielders. Before the 1950 season, he was sold by the Cubs to the Chicago White Sox but did not play for them.

In a one-season career, Reich was a .279 hitter (108-for-286) with three home runs and 34 RBI in 111 games, including  43 runs, 18 doubles, two triples, four stolen bases, and a .306 on-base percentage.

Following his brief stint in major leagues, Reich resumed his career in the minors and also managed the 1961 Idaho Falls Russets of the Pioneer League.

Transactions
Nov. 10, 1948 – Drafted by the Cleveland Indians from the Portland Beavers (PCL) in the rule 5 draft.
Apr. 30, 1949 – Selected off waivers by the Washington Senators from the Indians.
May 10, 1949 – Returned to the Indians by Washington following previous waiver selection.
May 18, 1949 – Selected off waivers by the Chicago Cubs from the Indians.
Feb.  2, 1950 – Purchased by the Chicago White Sox from the Cubs.

Throws left/Bats right
Notably, Reich also was one of those rare players who were not primarily pitchers in major league history who threw left-handed but batted right-handed. Other such players include Johnny Cooney, Rickey Henderson, Cleon Jones, Chucho Ramos, Cody Ross, Ryan Ludwick and Jimmy Ryan.

External links

Retrosheet

1917 births
2009 deaths
Bartlesville Bucs players
Baseball players from California
Chicago Cubs players
Chicago White Sox scouts
Cleveland Indians players
Eugene Emeralds players
Loyola Marymount Lions baseball players
Major League Baseball first basemen
Major League Baseball right fielders
Minor league baseball managers
Modesto Reds players
Portland Beavers players
Sacramento Solons players
Seattle Rainiers players
Siloam Springs Travelers players
Tacoma Tigers players
Washington Senators (1901–1960) players
Yakima Bears players